Kayumarth III, was the fifth ruler of the Paduspanid branch of Kojur. He was the son and successor of Ka'us III.

Biography
During the reign of Kayumarth's father, Ka'us III, the latter had Kayumarth imprisoned for unknown reasons. After eighteen years, Kayumarth managed to flee from prison, and had his father poisoned. Kayumarth's uncle, Bisotun ibn Ashraf, with the support of the Paduspanid noblemen, then ascended the Paduspanid throne. However, the people of Mazandaran quickly rose in revolt against him, and had him deposed in favor of Kayumarth. During Kayumarth's reign, his daughter married the Marashiyan Mir Qewam al-Din Marashi. Kayumarth died in 1555, and was succeeded by his brother Jahangir II.

Sources

 
 

16th-century monarchs in Asia
16th-century Iranian people
1555 deaths
Baduspanids
Year of birth unknown